Star Wars: X-wing – Rogue Squadron is a series of comic books written by Michael Stackpole (who also wrote the Star Wars: X-wing book series) and Darko Macan and published by Dark Horse Comics. The first issue was released on July 1, 1995. It ran for 35 issues. The story is set in the Star Wars galaxy approximately one year after Return of the Jedi.

The 2005 prequel series X-Wing – Rogue Leader tells of Luke Skywalker's final involvement with the squadron.

Story arcs

The Rebel Opposition (1995)
The art is by Allen Nunis. The Rebel Alliance's Rogue Squadron defend the New Republic against the remnants of the Empire shortly after the events of Return of the Jedi.

The Phantom Affair (1996)
Rogue Squadron must travel to a neutral planet to secure new cloaking technology from the Empire being sold to the highest bidder.

Battleground: Tatooine (1996)
Rogue Squadron goes to Tatooine to find a secret cache of weapons hidden by Sate Pestage, on the Darklighters' farm.

The Warrior Princess (1996–97)

Requiem for a Rogue (1997)
Rogue Squadron is sent to track down a lost Bothan ship full of innocent civilians; victim of a rare computer bug that transposes spatial coordinates. They soon learn that the mission is far more complicated. Wedge Antilles is shot down and presumed dead. The wild, savage humanoid natives are armed with Imperial blasters. Most everyone is acting completely out of character.

The Rogues must work with the Bothans to simply survive, rescue Wedge and discover the source of the strange energies making everyone off-kilter.

In the Empire's Service (1997)
Rogue Squadron and General Horton Salm's Defender Wing must take the Brentaal System from the hands of a slothful Imperial General, who has an ace up his sleeve. Recently assigned to Brentaal is the 181st Squadron, the Fighting 181st, led by none other than the deadly Baron Soontir Fel.

The Making of Baron Fel (1997)
Rogue Squadron mourns their lost comrades from the Battle of Brentaal, while on a mission of mercy on Corellia. The newly defected Baron Fel's family has been taken hostage, and its up to Rogue Squadron to get them out safely. During Soontir Fel's interrogation, he tells a tale of Imperial corruption and deception, and slowly executes a plan to defect to the Alliance. Along the way the Rogues encounter future allies and enemies in the form of two maverick CorSec officers, and an incompetent Imperial Liaison Officer.

Family Ties (1998)

Masquerade (1998)
Han Solo, Chewbacca, and Winter (disguised as Princess Leia) join the Rogues on a mission to Ciutric to make contact with Imperial Grand Vizier Sate Pestage, who wishes to defect.

Mandatory Retirement (1998)

Special issues
X-wing Rogue Squadron: Apple Jacks Special Bonus Story
X-wing Rogue Squadron 1/2

Prequel series 
X-Wing – Rogue Leader is a three-part comic book series set approximately one week after the Battle of Endor in Return of the Jedi. It was published by Dark Horse between September 28 and December 21, 2005.

Several participants in the destruction of the second Death Star are sent, a little while after the events of Bakura, to scout out Imperial activity in Corellian space. It quickly turns dangerous as Ten Numb is captured by rampaging Imperial Forces. The Rogues' attempt to rescue him comes too late as he does not survive the torture.

Rogue Squadron becomes more official as many more officers volunteer in the wake of the rescue attempt. The first assigned mission; to escort a Rebel convoy, and it then turns mysterious when Imperial fighters show up instead. The Rogue squadron pilots must depend on the aid of insurgents who hate them in order to survive.

Following the story's resolution, Luke Skywalker explains that he cannot stay with Rogue Squadron as he must focus on building a New Jedi Order.

Trade paperbacks
Star Wars: X-wing Rogue Squadron – The Phantom Affair
Star Wars: X-wing Rogue Squadron – Battleground: Tatooine
Star Wars: X-wing Rogue Squadron – The Warrior Princess
Star Wars: X-wing Rogue Squadron – Requiem for a Rogue
Star Wars: X-wing Rogue Squadron – In the Empire's Service
Star Wars: X-wing Rogue Squadron – Blood and Honor
Star Wars: X-wing Rogue Squadron – Masquerade
Star Wars: X-wing Rogue Squadron – Mandatory Retirement
Omnibus: X-wing Rogue Squadron – Volume 1
Omnibus: X-wing Rogue Squadron – Volume 2
Omnibus: X-wing Rogue Squadron – Volume 3
Omnibus: The Other Sons of Tatooine
Epic Collection: Star Wars – The New Republic, Volumes 2–3

References
Footnotes

Citations

1995 comics debuts
Dark Horse Comics titles
X-wing Rogue Squadron